Pseudobrimus is a genus of longhorn beetles of the subfamily Lamiinae, containing the following species:

 Pseudobrimus affinis Breuning, 1936
 Pseudobrimus congoanus Breuning, 1936
 Pseudobrimus fossulatus Breuning, 1970
 Pseudobrimus gabonicus Breuning, 1936
 Pseudobrimus griseomarmoratus Breuning, 1936
 Pseudobrimus griseosparsus Breuning, 1964
 Pseudobrimus latefasciatus Breuning, 1948
 Pseudobrimus nigrovittatus Breuning, 1959

References

Morimopsini